The Erasmus Brussels University of Applied Sciences and Arts (Dutch: Erasmushogeschool Brussel) is an institute of higher education based in Brussels, Belgium.

Like the EU student exchange programme ERASMUS, EhB is named after the humanistic philosopher and author Desiderius Erasmus, who resided in Anderlecht, a municipality of Brussels.

History 
The Flemish Higher Education Decree of 13 July 1994 ushered in a large-scale merger operation and reorganisation of the educational system (disciplines and curricula). More than 160 institutions were reduced to 22 colleges. Erasmus University College Brussels came into being in 1995 from a merger of some ten colleges in and around Brussels.

Department and programmes 
EhB has around 4500 students and consists of six departments that offer bachelor and master of Art degree programmes in 20 study areas.

Departments 

 Management, Media & Society
 Healthcare, Design & Technology
 Education
 School of Arts: Koninklijk Conservatorium Brussel (Brussels Royal Conservatory)
 School of Arts: Royal Institute for Theatre, Cinema and Sound (RITCS)

Bachelor and master degree programmes 

 Tourism and Recreation Management
 Communications Management
 Journalism
 Idea and Innovation Management
 Hotel Management
 Office Management
 Applied Computer Science
 Multimedia and Communication Science
 Bio-Medical Laboratory Technology
 Nursing and Dietetics
 Nursing
 Midwifery
 Music And Performing Arts
 Social Work
 Nursery School Teacher Training
 Pre-School Teacher Training
 Lower Secondary School Teacher Training
 Audio-Visual Arts
 Drama
 Urban Architecture
 Landscape and Garden Architecture

Brussels University Association 
Together with the Vrije Universiteit Brussel (Free University of Brussels), in 2003 the EhB created the Universitaire Associatie Brussel (Brussels University Association) to bring the master's degree programmes in line with the academic requirements of the Bologna declaration.

Notable graduates 

 Eric de Kuyper, Rits, 1967

References

External links 

 

Universities and colleges in Brussels
Universities and colleges formed by merger in Belgium
Art schools in Belgium
Desiderius Erasmus